The wheel of time or the wheel of history is a religious concept regarding the cyclical nature of time, predominant in Buddhism and Hinduism.

It may also refer to:

Books and derived works
The Wheel of Time, a series of fantasy novels that began in 1990 by Robert Jordan and continued by Brandon Sanderson
The Wheel of Time Collectible Card Game, a collectible card game based on the Jordan series
The Wheel of Time Roleplaying Game, a roleplaying game based on the Jordan series
 The Wheel of Time (video game), a first-person shooter based on the Jordan series
 The Wheel of Time (TV series), a 2021 TV series adaptation based on the novel series
Dragon Knight: The Wheel of Time, a 1998 anime OVA adaptation of Dragon Knight 4.

Other uses
Wheel of Time (film), a 2003 film directed by Werner Herzog
The Wheel of Time (album), a 2002 album by Sandra
"Wheel of Time", a 2010 song by Blind Guardian from At the Edge of Time

See also
Timewheel, a huge hourglass located in Budapest, Hungary
Wheel of the Year